Trapania inbiotica is a species of sea slug, a dorid nudibranch, a marine gastropod mollusc in the family Goniodorididae.

Distribution
This species was described from Cabo Blanco, Puntarenas, Costa Rica and from Islas Secas, Panamá.

Description
The body of this goniodorid nudibranch is translucent white with red patches composed of small red dots partly coalesced into irregular shaped spots. The rhinophores and gills are white with a few smaller red spots. The oral tentacles, lateral papillae, gills, and tail have red spots at the base and yellow tips.

Ecology
Like other species in this genus Trapania inbiotica probably feeds on Entoprocta, which often grow on sponges and other living substrata.

References

Goniodorididae
Gastropods described in 2000